Avon Long (June 18, 1910 – February 15, 1984) was an American Broadway actor and singer.

Biography
Long was born in Baltimore, Maryland. He attended Frederick Douglass High School, where he was especially influenced by the Latin teacher and drama coach, Nellie A. Buchanan.

Long performed in a number of Broadway shows, including Porgy and Bess (as Sportin' Life in the 1942 revival), and Beggar's Holiday (1946).  Long and Lena Horne co-introduced the Harold Arlen–Ted Koehler composition "As Long As I Live" in Cotton Club Parade (1934) when Horne was only 16 years old.

He reprised his role of Sportin' Life in the 1951 Columbia recording of Porgy and Bess, the most complete recording of the opera issued up to that time.  He also appeared with Thelma Carpenter in the 1952 revival of Shuffle Along, which was recorded by RCA Victor.

Long received a Tony Award nomination for Best Supporting or Featured Actor (Musical) in 1973, for the role of Dave in Don't Play Us Cheap. The all-black play opened at the Ethel Barrymore Theater in New York on May 16, 1972, and ran for 164 performances. Long, along with Thomas Anderson, Joshie Armstead, Robert Dunn, Jay Van Leer, Esther Rolle, Mabel King, George Ooppee McCurn, Frank Carey, Nate Barnett, and Rhetta Hughes, recreated their stage roles in a film production by Melvin Van Peebles, in 1973.

Long originated the role of John in Bubbling Brown Sugar on Broadway, which opened at the August Wilson Theatre (then-ANTA Playhouse) on March 2, 1976, and closed on December 31, 1977, after 766 performances.

Long also appeared in a number of films and television shows.  He played the elderly Chicken George Moore in Roots: The Next Generations miniseries, and had small roles in  Trading Places (1983) – memorable as Ezra, the servant to whom Ralph Bellamy gives a miserably small Christmas bonus ("maybe I'll go to the movies – by myself"), The Sting (1973) ("Flat rate!"), and Harry and Tonto (1974). He was originally cast to play George Jefferson in "All in the Family", but was  replaced based on negative feedback from Carroll O'Connor.

Long died from cancer at 73, on February 15, 1984, in New York City, and was interred in NY's Ferncliff Cemetery, in Hartsdale, New York.

His oldest granddaughter is author, artist and radio talk show host JoAnn Pinkney Wilcox, who wrote the book "Getting Paid To Keep You in Debt!"

Filmography

References

External links
 
 

1910 births
1984 deaths
African-American male actors
American male film actors
American male stage actors
American male television actors
Male actors from Baltimore
20th-century American male actors
Burials at Ferncliff Cemetery
20th-century African-American people
Deaths from cancer in New York (state)